Airee or Airy or Airi is a Chhetri and Pahadi Rajput surname found in Nepal and Uttarakhand, India. Notable people with the surname include:

Dipendra Singh Airee (born 2001), Nepalese cricketer
Kamal Singh Airee (born 2000), Nepalese cricketer
Kashi Singh Airy, Indian Kumaoni politician
Pradeep Singh Airee (born 1992), Nepalese cricketer

Nepali-language surnames
Khas surnames
Surnames of Nepalese origin